Men of America is a 1932 American pre-Code Western film directed by Ralph Ince and written by Samuel Ornitz and Jack Jungmeyer. The film stars William Boyd, Charles "Chic" Sale, Dorothy Wilson, Ralph Ince, and Henry Armetta. The film was released on November 25, 1932, by RKO Pictures.

Cast

References

External links 
 

1932 films
American black-and-white films
1930s English-language films
RKO Pictures films
American Western (genre) films
1932 Western (genre) films
Films directed by Ralph Ince
1930s American films